Ramón Rodríguez del Solar (born 8 September 1977 in Pilcopata, Cuzco) is a Peruvian footballer who plays as a striker for Santa Rosa in the Torneo Descentralizado. In his long career, Rodríguez has played for the likes of Cienciano, FBC Melgar, Total Clean, Deportivo Municipal, Sport Boys, Alianza Atlético, Inti Gas Deportes, and Cobresol and Real Garcilaso. His nicknamed is El Ratón (The Mouse)

Club career
Rodríguez started his professional career in Torneo Descentralizado with Cienciano, where he played from 1995 to 2003. He managed to score for the Cuzco based club in the 2nd leg of the 2001 Championship Playoffs against Alianza Lima in the 83rd minute, which then forced the match to a penalty shoot-out. His club lost the Championship 2–4 on penalties.

He made his league debut for Real Garcilaso in the second round (the first round was played by reserve players due to the Player's strike) of the 2012 season against Alianza Lima. Playing at the Inca Garcilaso de la Vega stadium, Rodríguez made history in that match with Real Garcilaso by scoring the club's first goal at home in the top-flight, the Torneo Descentralizado. His goal came in the 9th minute of the match by heading in a cross from Eduardo Uribe, and later in the second half Rodríguez provided an assist for Andy Pando's winning goal, which resulted in a 2–1 over the runners-up of the previous season. This match was Real Garcilaso's first home win ever in the Descentralizado.

Honours

Club
Cienciano
 Clausura: 2001, 2006
 Copa Sudamericana: 2003
 Apertura: 2005

Cobresol
 Peruvian Second Division: 2010

Real Garcilaso
Copa Perú: 2011

Individual
Second Division Top Scorer: 2010

References

External links

1977 births
Living people
People from Cusco
Peruvian footballers
Cienciano footballers
FBC Melgar footballers
Total Chalaco footballers
Deportivo Municipal footballers
Sport Boys footballers
Alianza Atlético footballers
Ayacucho FC footballers
Cobresol FBC footballers
Real Garcilaso footballers
Peruvian Primera División players
Peruvian Segunda División players
Copa Perú players
Association football forwards